Günyazı can refer to:

 Günyazı, Ceyhan
 Günyazı, Kargı